The Aeolidida is a taxonomic clade of sea slugs, specifically aeolid nudibranchs, marine gastropod molluscs in the clade Cladobranchia.
They are distinguished from other nudibranchs by their possession of cerata containing cnidosacs.

Taxonomy
Superfamily Flabellinoidea (= Pleuroprocta) Bergh, 1889
Family Apataidae Korshunova, Martynov, Bakken, Evertsen, Fletcher, Mudianta, Saito, Lundin, Schrödl & Picton, 2017
Family Coryphellidae Bergh, 1889
Family Cumanotidae Odhner, 1907
Family Flabellinidae Bergh, 1889
Family Flabellinopsidae Korshunova, Martynov, Bakken, Evertsen, Fletcher, Mudianta, Saito, Lundin, Schrödl & Picton, 2017
Family Notaeolidiidae Eliot, 1910
Family Paracoryphellidae M. C. Miller, 1971 
Family Samlidae Korshunova, Martynov, Bakken, Evertsen, Fletcher, Mudianta, Saito, Lundin, Schrödl & Picton, 2017
Superfamily Fionoidea (= Acleioprocta) Gray, 1857
Family Calmidae Iredale & O'Donoghue, 1923
Family Cuthonellidae Miller, 1971
Family Cuthonidae Odhner, 1934
Family Eubranchidae Odhner, 1934
Family Fionidae Gray, 1857
Family Pseudovermidae Thiele, 1931
Family Tergipedidae Bergh, 1889
Family Trinchesiidae F. Nordsieck, 1972
Superfamily Aeolidioidea (= Cleioprocta) Gray, 1827
Family Aeolidiidae Gray, 1827
Family Facelinidae Bergh, 1889
Family Glaucidae Gray, 1827
Family Piseinotecidae Edmunds, 1970
Family Pleurolidiidae Burn, 1966
Family Unidentiidae Millen & Hermosillo, 2012

References

Nudipleura